K'ara K'arani (Aymara k'ara k'ara crest, -ni a suffix to indicate ownership, "the one with a crest", Hispanicized spelling Caracarane) is a mountain in the Andes of southern Peru, about  high. It is located in the Puno Region, Puno Province, Tiquillaca District. K'ara K'arani lies between two rivers named Wanuni (Huanuni) and Uqi Jaqhi (Oqueaque). It is situated northeast of the mountains Pura Purani and Wiluyu.

References

Mountains of Puno Region
Mountains of Peru